Superego is an improvised sketch comedy podcast by American comedians Jeremy Carter, Matt Gourley, Mark McConville, and Paul F. Tompkins.

Concept
Superego is an improvised, absurdist sketch comedy podcast presented as a collection of case studies prefaced by "doctors" as a primary example of a particular disorder. Nearly all the sketches are completely improvised in each recording session, typically with one or two characters at the center and the rest of the cast reacting to that set-up. The segments generally run 5–10 minutes unedited and Gourley edits them down to a 3-5 minute show length.

The podcast is presented in an enhanced format that allows listeners to pick a chapter and provides additional visual content.

History
Superego was developed by Jeremy Carter and Matt Gourley, who met at a ComedySportz tournament in the mid-1990s and were founding contributors to Channel 101 where their show, Ultraforce, was a number one series. After finding the video production process to be a burden, they hit upon the idea of audio sketches as a less production-intensive medium. At a bar on the day after Christmas in 2005, Carter and Gourley first came up with the idea of a "Godcast"; the idea then transformed into a clinic for personality disorders in order to grant more improvisational freedom.

The podcast debuted in 2006. Mark McConville joined the podcast permanently in season 2 after having guested during the show's first season. Jeff Crocker also joined and brought his skills as a video producer. Most of the podcast's music is produced by James Bladon.

On July 17, 2014 Superego announced the addition of Paul F. Tompkins as an official member and the departure of Crocker.

Originally developed as an audio podcast, Superego has also occasionally released video 'Supershorts' that are animated and produced by Crocker. Superego's first live show, Superego Live!, was performed in Long Beach, California on December 10, 2008 and then again in Hollywood, California on March 11, 2009. The early live shows were in the style of a rehearsed sketch comedy revue. The group now performs a live version of the show regularly at venues like San Francisco Sketchfest, the Kansas City Improv Festival, the Bell House, Theatre 99, and the Solid Sound Festival. The live performances now generally take the form of the group and its guests wearing lab coats and improvising with the aid of sound effects and music.

Season 4 began on September 1, 2014 after a 15-month hiatus.

On August 17, 2015 it was announced that Superego would be doing a show titled Superego: Forgotten Classics that would be part of the premium subscription to the new Earwolf Howl app. On March 2, 2016, Howl.fm posted the first three Superego seasons and extra material including commentary and live performances, with copyrighted music edited out and replaced by new tracks composed by James Bladon. The website stated that the enhanced episodes would be posted later.

Superego formally ended on March 4, 2016 with episode 4:6, though according to the group special episodes will continue to be released in the future. The group held a 10th Anniversary show on March 5, 2016 at Largo at the Coronet to celebrate the show's history and ending.

In July 2018, it was announced that Superego would return for a season 5.

The Journeymen
The Journeymen, made up of Carter, Gourley, McConville, and James Bladon released an album in July 2013 titled Mount Us More. The album consists primarily of country western/rock performed by the group's alter egos named Shunt McGuppin, Mutt Taylor, Cubby Lauderbourne, and Jimmy Blades. Carter and Gourley split the writing for the tracks.

Shunt McGuppin released a follow-up solo EP titled Bad Honky in June 2015. The album features guests including Erinn Hayes and Tompkins.

Cast

Current members
 Dr. Jeremy Carter, PhD
 Dr. Matt Gourley, PyT
 Dr. Mark McConville, PhD 
 Dr. Paul F. Tompkins, PhD

Former members
 Jeff Crocker, Resident Specialist Emeritus

Recurring Guests
 James Bladon
Chris Tallman (Reno 911!, Chocolate News)

Notable guests
Steve Agee (The Sarah Silverman Program)
Drew Carey (Whose Line Is It Anyway?, The Drew Carey Show)
Neko Case (The New Pornographers)
Scott Chernoff (The Tonight Show with Conan O'Brien, Jimmy Kimmel Live!)
Andy Daly (Eastbound & Down, MadTV)
Jeff B. Davis (Whose Line Is It Anyway?, Mary Shelley's Frankenhole)
Ennis Esmer (Blindspot)
Colin Hanks (King Kong, Orange County, Dexter)
Dan Harmon (Community, Rick and Morty)
Erinn Hayes (Worst Week, Children's Hospital)
John Hodgman (The Daily Show, Bored to Death)
Lauren Lapkus (Crashing)
Thomas Lennon (The State, Reno 911!)
Amanda Lund (Ghost Ghirls)
Derek Mears (Pirates of the Caribbean, Friday the 13th)
Kumail Nanjiani (Silicon Valley)
Lauren Pritchard (MADtv)
Greg Proops (Whose Line Is It Anyway?, True Jackson, VP)
Mike Rock (Chelsea Lately)
Tom Scharpling (The Best Show on WFMU with Tom Scharpling)
Jason Sudeikis (Saturday Night Live, 30 Rock)
Carl Tart (Brooklyn 99)
Joe Lo Truglio (The State, Reno 911!, Superbad)

Recurring Characters/Sketches

Season 1
Shunt McGuppin
Imogene Kanouse
Mutt Taylor
Bruce 'The Throat' Hume and Ed 'The Inflection' Olivas
Milton and Dupree
Trevor Lundgren
The Reverends Allard H. Mundy Jr. and Merlin Escondante Daniels
Dwight Loomis
Grandma Queen Bee
Grandma Jonesy

Season 2
Maggie The GPS
Reverend Leroy Jenkins
Coach Helzevec
Janice Caaf
Paul F. Tompkins
FDR
Pete Balch

Season 3
Cylon Jim and Phil
Hoyt Runyon
Don DiMello
Orchard Glen High School Faculty
Family Feud
HR Giger
Roy Cabrus

Season 4
God's Crazy Monsters
Leroy Jenkins
Janice Caaf
The American English Dictionary

Trivia
 Different James Bond theme songs are used as the themes to each of Superego's seasons. This has included On Her Majesty's Secret Service, The Man with the Golden Gun, and A View to a Kill.
 Dwight Loomis is based on the actor George Buck Flower.
 Leroy Jenkins as played by Carter is based upon televangelist Leroy Jenkins.
 The Character of Imogene was created after Gourley found the 'mouse' vocal filter on GarageBand.
 Bruce and Ed, the movie voice guys were developed by Carter and Gourley endlessly trying to annoy their ex-wife and ex-girlfriend respectively.
 Gourley and McConville appeared on an episode of Lingo! hosted by Chuck Woolery. They were dressed like aliens, as it was SciFi week. They won.
 Superego was originally conceived on a cocktail napkin at an Irish pub in Seal Beach, California.
 The characters of Vyvyan and Cyril from 'Pageturner Presents' are named after Oscar Wilde's two sons.
 Grandma Queen Bee and Grandma Jonesy are based on Carter and Gourley's actual grandmothers.
 The '3 Total Assholes' sketch with Jason Sudeikis and Joe Lo Truglio was actually recorded on a laptop, in a car.
 The number 710 is frequently used throughout the podcast, referencing the CA-710 Long Beach freeway.
 Trevor Lundegaard/Lungren/Rothstein never has the same last name.
 The Coach Helzevec character was thrown at Gourley in spite of the fact that he knows nothing about sports except to name check Dan Fouts.
 The character of Don DiMello originated on the Comedy Bang! Bang! podcast.

Other podcast appearances
 In Season 3 Superego did a multi episode collaboration with the popular Thrilling Adventure Hour podcast titled "The War of Two Worlds."
 Comedy Bang! Bang!, episode #308
 The Nerdist Podcast, episode #548
 Walking the Room, episode #125
 The Discussion with Kevin Grigg
 Search for Treasure, episode #132
 Beginnings, episode 128
 Pop My Culture, episode #52
 This American Wife, episode #24

Awards
 1st Place - Viral Video Night, Improv Olympic West, November 2008
 The first double 5 star rating on Edgy Podcast Reviews
 Best First-Wave Podcast That's Better Than Ever, Splitsider, 2011

References

External links
 
 
 Superego  on Howl.fm

Comedy and humor podcasts
Channel 101
Audio podcasts
2006 podcast debuts
Improvisational podcasts
American podcasts